Paul Holsgrove (born 26 August 1969) is an English former professional footballer who played as a midfielder.

He played professional football from 1987 until 2001 and played in three countries, His native England, Netherlands and Scotland. Holsgrove played for Aldershot, Wokingham Town, Luton Town, Heracles Almelo, Millwall, Reading, Grimsby Town, Crewe Alexandra, Stoke City, Hibernian, Airdrieonians, Darlington, Hayes, Slough Town and Windsor & Eton.

Career
Holsgrove was born in Wellington, Shropshire and began his career with Aldershot. He played for the Shots four times, after which he dropped into non-League, playing for Farnborough Town and Wokingham Town. Following failed trials at Wimbledon and West Bromwich Albion he joined Luton Town. Holsgrove only played twice for the Hatters in two seasons at Kenilworth Road and then decided to move to the Netherlands to play for Eerste Divisie side Heracles Almelo. Holsgrove played 21 times for "Heraclieden" scoring six goals for the 1991–92 season before returning to England. He joined Millwall in August 1993 where he played 15 times in 1992–93 but injury kept him out of the 1993–94 season. He joined Reading in August 1994 and played 29 times in 1994–95 scoring four goals. He played in 37 games in 1995–96 and 17 times in 1996–97 before finding himself out of the side in 1997–98. He joined Grimsby Town on loan playing in ten matches in two months.

He left Reading to join Crewe Alexandra on a non-contract basis in November 1997 and played nine times for the Alex before joining Stoke City in January 1998. He played 12 times for Stoke scoring once which came in a 1–1 draw with Ipswich Town on 7 February 1998. He left Stoke after they suffered relegation. In 1998 he moved to Scotland joining Hibernian playing 19 games scoring once. The season after he had a spell playing  on loan for Airdrieonians. Paul moved back south of the border before the end of the season. He returned to England joining for Darlington. He then played for Hayes, Slough Town and Windsor & Eton.

Personal

His father John Holsgrove and brother Lee Holsgrove were also professional footballers.

His son, Jordan Holsgrove, has embarked on a career as a professional footballer. Jordan came through Reading's academy and U23 system, and he signed for Spanish club Celta Vigo in September 2020. Jordan was born in Edinburgh while his father played For Hibernian, and he has represented Scotland in youth internationals up to and including under-21.

Career statistics
Source:

A.  The "Other" column constitutes appearances and goals in the Anglo-Italian Cup, Football League Trophy.

References

External links
 
 Paul Holsgrove Heracles Almelo stats at vi.nl

Living people
1969 births
People from Wellington, Shropshire
English footballers
Aldershot F.C. players
Farnborough F.C. players
Wokingham Town F.C. players
Luton Town F.C. players
Heracles Almelo players
Millwall F.C. players
Reading F.C. players
Grimsby Town F.C. players
Crewe Alexandra F.C. players
Stoke City F.C. players
Brighton & Hove Albion F.C. players
Hibernian F.C. players
Airdrieonians F.C. (1878) players
Darlington F.C. players
Hayes F.C. players
Slough Town F.C. players
Windsor & Eton F.C. players
English Football League players
Scottish Football League players
National League (English football) players
Eerste Divisie players
Association football midfielders